Bodträskån ("Bodträsk River") is a small river that flows into Lule River in Norrbotten, Sweden.

Description
The river starts in Jokkmokk municipality and ends at Bodträskfors, a small village, in Edefors parish. Until the 1950s it was quite important but today the importance is minuscule. The village of Bodträskfors houses an impressive mansion building from 1870.

See also
Lule River
Jokkmokk Municipality
Norrbotten
Sweden

References

Lule River basin
Rivers of Norrbotten County